Suzanne N.J. 'Susie' Chun Oakland (born June 27, 1961) is an American politician and former Democratic member of the Hawaii Senate who represented the 13th District from 1996 to 2016. Previously she was a member of the Hawaii House of Representatives from 1990 to 1996. She is generally considered to have liberal political views.

Political career and related activities

Member of the following Senate committees
Human Services (Chair)
Education
Ways and Means
Heath
Agriculture

Education
Chun Oakland received her BA degree in Communications and Psychology from the University of Hawaii.

Personal life

Suzanne Chun Oakland is the eldest of three siblings born to Philip S. Chun and Mei-Chih Chun. She is the mother of three children and two grandchildren.

External links
Hawaii State Legislature - Senator Suzanne Chun Oakland official government website
Project Vote Smart - Senator Suzanne Nyuk Jun Chun Oakland (HI) profile
voting record, issue positions (Political Courage Test)
Follow the Money'' - Suzanne N J Chun Oakland
2008 2006 2004  2002 2000 State Senate campaign contributions

Democratic Party Hawaii state senators
1961 births
Living people
University of Hawaiʻi alumni
Women state legislators in Hawaii
Democratic Party members of the Hawaii House of Representatives
Honolulu City Council members
Women city councillors in Hawaii
21st-century American politicians
21st-century American women politicians
Hawaii politicians of Chinese descent
Asian-American city council members